João Miguel Macedo Silva (born 7 April 1995) is a Portuguese professional footballer who plays as a goalkeeper for Israeli Premier League club Beitar Jerusalem.

Club career

Vitória Guimarães
Born in Guimarães, Silva joined the academy of local Vitória S.C. at the age of 18. He started playing as a senior with their reserves but, at the age of just 20, was promoted to the first team by manager Sérgio Conceição. His first match in the Primeira Liga occurred on 28 November 2015 in a 2–1 away win against Boavista FC, and he finished the season with a further 23 appearances as his team finished in tenth position.

In the following years, Silva constantly battled for first-choice status with Brazilian Douglas.

APOEL
Free agent Silva joined APOEL FC of the Cypriot First Division in July 2020, with Vitória keeping 62% of his sporting rights regarding any future transfer. During his one-year spell in Nicosia, he played 25 competitive games.

Marítimo
Silva signed a three-year contract with C.S. Marítimo on 29 June 2021. Mainly backup to Paulo Vítor, he totalled 17 appearances for the Madeirans in one and a half seasons.

Beitar Jerusalem
On 28 January 2023, Silva agreed to a five-month deal at Israeli Premier League club Beitar Jerusalem FC; Marítimo remained entitled to a percentage of any future transfer.

International career
Silva won the first of his two caps for Portugal at under-21 level on 6 October 2016, in a 3–3 away draw to Hungary for the 2017 UEFA European Championship qualifiers.

References

External links

Portuguese League profile 

1995 births
Living people
Sportspeople from Guimarães
Portuguese footballers
Association football goalkeepers
Primeira Liga players
Liga Portugal 2 players
Campeonato de Portugal (league) players
F.C. Vizela players
Vitória S.C. B players
Vitória S.C. players
C.S. Marítimo players
Cypriot First Division players
APOEL FC players
Israeli Premier League players
Beitar Jerusalem F.C. players
Portugal under-21 international footballers
Portuguese expatriate footballers
Expatriate footballers in Cyprus
Expatriate footballers in Israel
Portuguese expatriate sportspeople in Cyprus
Portuguese expatriate sportspeople in Israel